Shuqualak Creek is a stream in the U.S. state of Mississippi.

Shuqualak is a name derived from the Choctaw language purported to mean "beads". A variant name is "Shocoloc Creek".

References

Rivers of Mississippi
Rivers of Kemper County, Mississippi
Rivers of Noxubee County, Mississippi
Mississippi placenames of Native American origin